Milanović or Milanovic is a South Slavic surname derived from a masculine given name Milan. It may refer to:

Bojan Milanović (born 1961), musician from Šid, Serbia
Branko Milanović (born 1953), Lead economist in the World Bank's research department
Fred Milanovich (1915–1997), American politician
Goran Milanovic, character in the UK soap opera Coronation Street
Igor Milanović (born 1965), retired Serbian water polo player
Milan Milanović (born 1991), Serbian professional footballer
Miloš Milanović (born 1981), Serbian figure skater
Scott Milanovich (born 1973), American and Canadian football quarterback and coach
Sofía Mulánovich (born 1983), Peruvian surfer
Tanja Milanović (born 1977), former handballer from Serbia, playing left back
Vesna Milanović-Litre (born 1986), Croatian handballer
Zoran Milanović (born 1966), President of Croatia and former Prime Minister of Croatia

See also
Milanowich
Milankovic (disambiguation)
Milinković
Milinović
Milanovac (disambiguation)

Serbian surnames
Croatian surnames
Patronymic surnames
Surnames from given names